Julia Selepen (born 19 October 1983 in Kaunas) is a Lithuanian figure skater. She is the 2001 and 2002 Lithuanian silver medalist. She placed 33rd at the 2001 European Figure Skating Championships. She competed for three seasons on the Junior Grand Prix with the highest placement of 22nd at the 2001–2002 ISU Junior Grand Prix event in Gdańsk, Poland.

Results

External links
 

Lithuanian female single skaters
1983 births
Living people
Sportspeople from Kaunas